The Church of St. Anthony of Padua (Turkish: Sent Antuan Kilisesi), alternatively known as Sant'Antonio di Padova Church or S. Antonio di Padova, is the largest Catholic church in Istanbul, Turkey. It is located on İstiklal Avenue in the Beyoğlu district.

Together with the churches of St. Mary Draperis (also on Istiklal Avenue), and of SS. Peter and Paul in Galata, it was one of three Levantine parishes in Beyoglu. Today it is run by Italian priests. Saturday Mass in Italian begins at 19:00; Sunday Mass in Polish is at 9:30, in English at 10:00 and at 17:00 in Turkish; and Tuesday Mass in Turkish begins at 11:00. Weekday Masses are in English at 8:00.

History 
The original Church of St. Anthony of Padua was built in 1725 by the Italian community of Istanbul, but was later demolished and replaced with the current building which was constructed on the same site. The current basilican church, along with the adjacent residential buildings (known as the St. Antoine Apartmanları) was built between 1906 and 1912 in Venetian Neo-Gothic style, again by the city's Italian community (mostly made up of people of Genoese and Venetian descent, the community amounted to about 40,000 at the start of the 20th century). The building was designed by the Levantine architect Giulio Mongeri, who also designed other important buildings in Turkey, such as the Maçka Palas in Nişantaşı and the Neo-Byzantine Karaköy Palas bank building in Karaköy (Galata), Istanbul, as well as the first headquarters of the Türkiye İş Bankası in Ankara.

Pope John XXIII preached here for 10 years while he was the Vatican's ambassador to Turkey before being chosen as pope. He is known as "the Turkish Pope" because of his fluency in Turkish and his oft-expressed love for Turkey and for Istanbul in particular.

Since 2016 a legal battle has raged over the church which has been put up for sale by a man claiming to act for the site's legal owner. According to news reports, Sebahattin Gök obtained a power of attorney from the owners of the land and then attempted to sell it before lawyers acting on behalf of the Vatican took steps to prevent the sale.

Other Roman Catholic churches in Istanbul 
St. Anthony of Padua may be the most important Roman Catholic church in Istanbul, and with the largest congregation, but there are other Roman Catholic churches in the city too. These include the Cathedral of the Holy Spirit (1846) in Harbiye; St. Louis of the French (1581) and Santa Maria Draperis in Beyoğlu; Sts. Peter and Paul (1841) in Galata; the Church of the Assumption in Moda, Kadıköy; and St. Stephen in Yeşilköy.

Gallery

See also
 Levantines (Latin Christians)

Notes

References

External links 
 Some more pictures
 

Roman Catholic churches completed in 1912
Antonio di Padova, Istanbul, S.
Gothic Revival church buildings in Turkey
Venetian Gothic architecture
Beyoğlu
1912 establishments in the Ottoman Empire
20th-century Roman Catholic church buildings in Turkey